Cannabis concentrate (also called marijuana concentrate, marijuana extract, or cannabis extract) is a tetrahydrocannabinol (THC) and/or cannabidiol (CBD) concentrated mass. Cannabis concentrates contain high THC levels that range from 40% to over 90%, stronger in THC content than high-grade marijuana, which normally measures around 20% THC levels.

Volatile solvents, such as ethanol, butane, propane or hexane, may be used to prepare extracts, possibly  to fire and explosion hazards in uncontrolled environments. Supercritical fluid extraction using carbon dioxide alleviates concerns of fire and explosion and results in a high-quality product.

Legally produced concentrates for retail sale in legalized U.S. states are often packaged in small lip-balm sized containers.

Colorado 
In Colorado, the Marijuana Enforcement Division (MED) regulates almost every facet of the cannabis seed-to-sale process. There are heavy regulations on the containers that hold the concentrate: containers must be child-resistant, opaque, and have a multitude of legal text warning the consumer of the risks of consumption. MED also regulates the creation or extraction of cannabis extract.

List of concentrates
Common types of cannabis concentrate:

 Badder/budder
 Cannabis flower essential oil
 Caviar (moon rocks) - Cannabis buds dipped in or sprayed with hash oil, then rolled in kief.
 Crumble
 Crystalline
 Distillate
 Dry sift
 Hashish or hash - a cannabis concentrate traditionally made by drying the cannabis plant and beating the dried female plant material over a series of screens and then sifting, collecting, and pressing the particles.
 Bubble hash - water-purified hashish
 Charas - a cannabis concentrate created by expressing the flower of Cannabis Indica between the hands and removing the residue.
 Hash oil 
Fully extracted cannabis oil
 Butane hash oil (BHO)
  oil
 Honeycomb
 Kief
 Live resin
 Pull and snap
 Rosin
 Shatter
 Taffy
 Terp sauce
 Tincture of cannabis
 Wax

The major difference between live resin and other cannabis concentrates lies in the way they are produced. The manufacturing of live resin involves fresh, live cannabis either freshly harvested or flash-frozen cannabis. This helps protect plant's content matter, aroma and flavor.

References

Sources

External links

Concentrate